44 Tauri, also known as HD 1287 and IM Tauri, is a star located about 210 light years from the Earth, in the constellation Taurus. It is a 5th magnitude star, making it faintly visible to the naked eye of an observer located far from city lights. It is a Delta Scuti variable star, ranging between magnitude 5.37 and 5.58 over a period of about 3.5 hours.

In 1966, Ivan Danziger and Robert Dickens discovered that 44 Tauri was a low amplitude variable star, with a period of approximately 3.22 hours. In a follow-up study published the next year, they reported that the period was irregular, indicating beat phenomena, and they classified it as a δ Scuti variable.. In 1968, 44 Tauri was given the variable star designation IM Tauri.

44 Tauri has been a popular object for detailed astroseismic and spectroscopic studies, because its very slow (relative to other δ Scuti stars) rotation speed of  km/sec does not complicate pulsation mode identification or greatly broaden spectral lines. As of 2010, 44 Tauri had been found to pulsate with 15 independent periods, ranging from 1.89 to 4.52 hours.

References

Taurus (constellation)
019513
026322
Durchmusterung objects
Tauri, IM
Tauri, 044
Delta Scuti variables
F-type subgiants
Tauri, p